Mount Celeste is the unofficial name for a mountain located on Vancouver Island, British Columbia. It shares the name Celeste with two peaks in the Cariboo region of the BC Interior. Within the boundaries of Strathcona Provincial Park, this peak lies at the north end of Rees Ridge. Iceberg Peak lies at the south end of this ridge.

History
The first ascent of this peak is credited to Jack Horbury and Jock Sutherland on August 18, 1934.

Appearances in popular culture 

A fictional version of Mount Celeste is featured as the primary setting in the 2016 platforming game Celeste Classic and the 2018 platforming game Celeste. 
The game is about the personal struggles the main character Madeline faces as she attempts to climb the mountain. The mountain is also shown on the Instagram page of in-game character Theo.

Sources

References

External links
 Strathcona Provincial Park from British Columbia Ministry of Environment website.
 NRC Geo Name Search - Rees Ridge Retrieved October 28, 2006

Two-thousanders of British Columbia
Vancouver Island Ranges